Campanario Formation is a Miocene geological formation in the high Andes of Central Chile and northern Neuquén Province in Argentina. The formation crops out around the upper parts of the basins of Maule and Ñuble rivers.

References 

Geologic formations of Chile
Geologic formations of Argentina
Miocene Series of South America
Pliocene Series of South America
Neogene Argentina
Neogene Chile
Tuff formations
Geology of Biobío Region
Geology of Maule Region
Geology of Neuquén Province